Stephen Michael Kosslyn (born 1948) is an American psychologist and neuroscientist. Kosslyn is best known for his work on visual cognition and the science of learning. Kosslyn currently serves as the president of Active Learning Sciences Inc., which helps institutions design active-learning based courses and educational programs. He is also the founder and chief academic officer of Foundry College, an online two-year college.

Biography 

Kosslyn attended graduate school at Stanford University and received a PhD in psychology from Stanford in 1974. After an appointment as assistant professor of psychology at Johns Hopkins, he joined the faculty at Harvard in 1977, where he is currently listed as Professor Emeritus. At Harvard, Kosslyn served as the departmental chair, Dean of Social Sciences, and the John Lindsley Professor. He also was co-director of the Mind of the Market Lab at Harvard Business School and was an associate in the department of neurology at the Massachusetts General Hospital. In 2010, Kosslyn was appointed director of the Center for Advanced Study in the Behavioral Sciences at Stanford University. Kosslyn was then the Founding Dean and Chief Academic Officer of the Minerva Schools (now Minerva University). 

Between 1998 and 2002, Kosslyn received $200,000 in donations from Jeffrey Epstein for his research. A report from Harvard University shows Kosslyn had known Epstein for about nine years and supported his application as a visiting fellow in the department of psychology in September 2005. The report concluded that Kosslyn did not disclose Epstein's donations in the accompanying documents. Epstein "lacked academic qualifications," but there was speculation that his application was approved with the support of Kosslyn as the head of the department. The report also noted that disclosure was not requested and Harvard—having accepted the gifts—was previously aware of this funding. Epstein withdrew from his appointment in 2006 following his arrest for sex criminal offenses.

Kosslyn has received numerous honors for his research. These include the National Academy of Sciences Initiatives in Research Award, the Prix Jean-Louis Signoret, three honorary doctorates (from the University of Caen, France; the University of Paris-Descartes, France; the University of Bern, Switzerland), a Guggenheim fellowship, and a Cattell Award. He was elected to the American Academy of Arts and Sciences, the Society of Experimental Psychologists, and Academia Rodinensis pro Remediatione (Switzerland).

Publications 
Kosslyn has published over 350 scientific papers and written or co-authored 15 books and edited or co-edited 13 books, including: 
 1980. Image and Mind
 1983. Ghosts in the Mind's Machine
 1992. Wet Mind, with Olivier Koenig
 1994. Elements of Graph Design
 1994. Image and Brain
 2001. Psychology: The Brain, the Person, the World (2001, 2004), with R.S. Rosenberg
 2006. The Case for Mental Imagery, with W.L. Thompson and G. Ganis
 2006. Graph Design for the Eye and Mind
 2006. Cognitive Psychology: Mind and Brain with E.E. Smith
 2007. Clear and to the Point: 8 Psychological Principles for Compelling PowerPoint Presentations
 2010. Psychology in Context, with R.S. Rosenberg
 2010. Abnormal Psychology (2010, 2014), with R.S. Rosenberg
 2011. Better PowerPoint
 2013. Top Brain, Bottom Brain: Surprising Insights into How You Think, with G.W. Miller 
 2017. Building the Intentional University, edited with B. Nelson
 2019. Introducing Psychology: The Brain, the Person, the Group (5th edition), with R.S. Rosenberg
 2020. Active Learning Online: Five Principles that Make Online Courses Come Alive

References

External links 

Kosslyn Lab at Harvard University
 "Psychology: From Theory to Practice - A Conversation with Stephen Kosslyn", Ideas Roadshow, 2014

1948 births
Living people
American cognitive neuroscientists
University of California, Los Angeles alumni
Stanford University alumni
Fellows of the American Academy of Arts and Sciences
Johns Hopkins University faculty
Brandeis University faculty
Harvard University faculty
Fellows of the Cognitive Science Society
American expatriates in Switzerland